152nd Regiment may refer to:
 152nd Infantry Regiment "Sassari", a unit of the Italian Army since 1915
 , a unit of the 7th Armoured Brigade (France)
 152nd (Ulster) Transport Regiment, a unit of the United Kingdom Territorial Army
 152nd Punjabis, a British Indian Army regiment serving in Palestine, 1918-1921
 152nd Illinois Infantry Regiment, a unit of the Union (North) Army during the American Civil War
 152nd New York Infantry Regiment, a unit of the Union (North) Army during the American Civil War
 152nd Ohio Infantry Regiment, a unit of the Union (North) Army during the American Civil War
 152nd Infantry Regiment (United States), a regiment of the Indiana Army National Guard
 152nd Tank Regiment, a component of the Russian Ground Forces' 27th Guards Rifle Division at Totskoye in the Volga-Urals Military District